Jason Horn (born c. 1973) is a former All-American defensive tackle who played for the Michigan Wolverines football team from 1992 to 1995.  

Horn grew up on a farm in Tippecanoe County, Indiana, a short distance from the Purdue University campus. He attended McCutcheon High School.

He played college football for Michigan from 1992 to 1995. 

He was selected by the American Football Coaches Association as a first-team defensive lineman on the 1995 All-America college football team. He was selected for the second team by the Associated Press. He was a first-team All-Big Ten pick in both 1994 and 1995. 

In 1995, Horn had 11 sacks, 18 tackles for a loss, and a school-record 136 yards of tackles for loss yardage.  Over his four years at Michigan, he played 48 games and finished among Michigan's all-time leaders with 24 sacks (second), 184 yards on sacks (third), 39 tackles for loss (third), and 185 yards on tackles for loss (second).

References

1970s births
Living people
American football defensive tackles
Michigan Wolverines football players